Mike Stone (born November 30, 1969) is an American heavy metal guitarist, best known for his involvement in the progressive metal band Queensrÿche. He joined Queensrÿche for their 2003 Tribe tour, and made his first appearance on the 2003 album Tribe, with writing credits for the song "Losing Myself". Stone was the guitarist for the rock band Speed-X, and currently the guitarist and backup vocalist of the alternative punk rock band, The Stick People.

Biography
In December 1992, Stone joined Criss, the solo project of former KISS drummer Peter Criss. The group toured extensively and released one album, Cat #1, in August 1994. Stone left the group in December 1995. Stone also joined Jonas Hansson Band in 1994 for one album called (No.1).

In 2008, Peavey introduced a signature Mike Stone guitar at the Winter NAMM Show. Called the MS-1, the instrument was designed by Stone, motorcycle designer Erik Buell and the Peavey Custom Guitar Shop. Later in the year, Stone performed in a band called Speed X, with Nick Catanese of Black Label Society on guitar and vocals, as well as Josh Sattler on bass and Mike Froedge on drums, both from Doubledrive.

On February 3, 2009, Stone announced the end of his association with Queensrÿche to focus on his side-project Speed-X, although court declarations (Michael Wilton in particular) later revealed Geoff and Susan Tate fired him without discussing it with the other band members:

Shortly after his departure from Queensrÿche, Stone spoke with producer Dito Godwin, who was working with a new act eventually becoming The Stick People, and offered his talent to the organization in late 2009, early 2010.

In 2011 Mike Stone released a CD on Rat Pak Records with blues band Kings Highway titled "The Line" with the track "Its On" featured in a Major League Baseball commercial.

In 2012 Mike Stone released three very diverse CDs on Rat Pak Records. The first "Go Town" a follow up for blues band Kings Highway. Then, punk rock Tomakazee's debut CD with longtime friend and bandmate of multiple bands, Tom Purcelll. Finally, the release of the "Lucky Dog" from the 1940s era jazz swing band The Mike Stone Trio.

On July 2, 2013 Stone has joined the musical team creating the trans-media project Dragon Kings. He is taking the lead songwriting role as well as playing lead guitar and contributing vocals on all tracks. "It’s great to be working with Mike," says project lead Timothy Brown. "He brings exactly the kind of progressive vibe our album needs."

Philanthropy
Stone is a vocal proponent of music education for children. In 2007, he signed on as an official supporter of Little Kids Rock, a nonprofit organization that provides free musical instruments and instruction to children in underserved public schools throughout the United States. He sits on the organization's Honorary Board of Directors.

Discography

Eden (1984–1985)
Eden

Criss (1992–95)
Criss (EP) – December 1993
Cat #1 – August 16, 1994
Jonas Hansson Band/No.1 – 1994

Klover
Feel Lucky Punk 1995

Mike Stone (Solo)
Clear Nights and Cloudy Days - 1999
Anywhere - 2010

Iain Ashley Hersey
Fallen Angel – 2001

Queensrÿche (2003–2009, 2021–present)
Tribe – July 22, 2003
The Art of Live – June 8, 2004
Operation: Mindcrime II – March 29, 2006
Mindcrime at the Moore – April 4, 2007
Take Cover - November 13, 2007
Digital Noise Alliance - October 7, 2022

Speed-X (2009–Present) 
Flat Black – 2009

Trance Sonics (2009–2010)
Trance Sonics – 2010

The Stick People (2009–2010)
Trust - Single – 2009
Think About That - Single – 2010

The Stick People (2010–2013)
Madness – 2013

Kings Highway (2010–Present)
The Line – 2011
Go Town – 2012

The Mike Stone Trio (2012–Present)
Lucky Dog – 2012

Guest appearances
Almah (band) - Almah (2006) (guitar)
WiszdomStone (band) - Rise (2009) (guitar)

References

External links
 Mike Stone at Facebook

20th-century American guitarists
1969 births
American heavy metal guitarists
Living people
Progressive metal guitarists
Queensrÿche members
Rhythm guitarists
The Minus 5 members
Tuatara (band) members